The Riga class was the NATO reporting name for class of frigates built for the Soviet Navy in the 1950s. The Soviet designation for these ships was Storozhevoi Korabl (escort ship) Project 50 Gornostay (Ermine stoat). The Riga class was analogous to World War II era destroyer escorts.

Design
According to Conway's, this simpler group of ships were ordered by Joseph Stalin who was concerned about the cost of large ships. The class introduced high pressure steam turbines and new radars into Soviet service. The bridge, gun turrets, and magazines were covered in -thick armour. The main armament comprised three single dual-purpose  guns with remote power control and a single Yakor type fire control director. The machinery comprised two TV-9 steam turbines with two boilers and had initial problems with reliability.

The Project 50 Riga class was a rather simplistic and straight forward design.  With their basic capabilities, moderate size and ease of operation, they made perfect export vessels for smaller navies where such ships could easily fill the multi-purpose role, taking the place of large minesweepers and actual destroyers.

There was a modernisation programme designated Project 50 A in the late 1950s early 1960s. This included fitting anti-submarine rocket launchers (RBU-2500) new radar and adding permanent ballast for improved stability.

Ships

A total of 68 ships were built by Nikolayev yards (20 ships), Komsomolsk-on-Amur (7 ships) and Kaliningrad (the lead yard 41 ships). Most ships were decommissioned by 1980, however some were sold to China. The programme was cut short by Nikita Khrushchev in 1956 as the ships were becoming obsolete and the last ship was completed in 1959.

Export operators
 Bulgarian Navy : 3 ships (Druzki, Smeli and Bodri) operated 1957-1990, decommissioned 1990
 4 ships were built in kits for the People's Liberation Army Navy to be licence assembled in China as Chengdu class (Type 6601/01) frigate. After that, PRC built 5 ships with a different gun arrangements as Jiangnan class (Type 065) frigate, reverse-engineered copies from type 6601.
 Finnish Navy : 2 ships (Uusimaa and  Hämeenmaa) acquired 1964, decommissioned 1979 and 1985 (source Conway's)
 East German Navy :  4 ships (Ernst Thälmann, Karl Marx, Karl Liebknecht, Friedrich Engels)
 Indonesian Navy: 8 ships (Jos Sudarso, Slamet Rijadi, Ngurah Rai, Monginsidi, Lambung Mangkurat, Hang Tuah, Kakiali, Nuku) transferred 1962-1964,  decommissioned 1971-1986 (Source Conway's)

See also

 List of ships of the Soviet Navy
 List of ships of Russia by project number

Notes

References
 Gardiner, Robert; Chumbley, Stephen & Budzbon, Przemysław (1995). Conway's All the World's Fighting Ships 1947-1995. Annapolis, Maryland: Naval Institute Press. 
 page from FAS 
 Marinekameradschaft KSS e.V. - Riga Class
 site in Russian
  Russian Riga Class Frigates - Complete Ship List

Frigate classes